The Ephraim Village Hall is located in Ephraim, Wisconsin.

History
Originally to house municipal functions, the building has also been used as a library and for various social functions. It was listed on the National Register of Historic Places in 1985 and on the State Register of Historic Places in 1989.

References

City and town halls on the National Register of Historic Places in Wisconsin
Libraries on the National Register of Historic Places in Wisconsin
National Register of Historic Places in Door County, Wisconsin
Public libraries in Wisconsin
Arts and Crafts architecture in the United States
Limestone buildings in the United States
Government buildings completed in 1927